

Ibis the Invincible

Ice

Icemaiden

Icicle

Icon

Immortal Man

Impulse

Inspector Henderson

Inza Cramer-Nelson 
Inza Cramer (also Inza Saunders) is a fictional character appearing in American comic books published by DC Comics. Inza debuted in More Fun Comics #55 in 1940, and was created by writer Gardner Fox and artist Howard Sherman. 

Originally, the character was created as a love interest for Kent Nelson, whom starred as Doctor Fate. She would eventually become the fourth (and second female) character to bear the Doctor Fate codename. Her incarnations differs from other versions, whom are traditionally considered agents of the Lords of Order, whearas she was unknowingly a agent for the Lords of Chaos.

Fictional history 
In a scheme to lure in Doctor Fate, Inza was kidnapped by the scientific villain, Wotan. Inza and Doctor Fate meet, the woman enamoured with a life potentially filled with adventure and would accompany Doctor Fate as his partner. Eventually, Kent Nelson revealed his identity to her and she would support him when he became a medical doctor, accompanying him as a nurse. At some point, she also pursued a doctorate in archaeology similarly to her husband.

Later, the two would marry, with the magic of the Tower of Fate keeping them young. Overtime, their marriage became strained due to Nabu's influence on Doctor Fate and Inza coming to resent having to be in a passive role within the Tower of Fate, resulting in a loss of a social life. Despite later having some romantic feelings for another man, Inza ultimately remained faithful to Kent with intent on working through their martial problems.

Eventually, Inza and Nelson would be killed in the wake of the cosmic event known as kali yuga, the Lords of Chaos empowered and weakening Nabu, rapidly aging both of them and the strain being too much for Inza to bear. Eventually, Nelson too was killed and in the aftermath, the two would live out their afterlfie within the Amulet of Anubis for a time, the pair creating the life they missed out in their lifetime in the dimension, including a child.

Eventually, the pair are resurrected into younger bodies and Inza becomes the sole Doctor Fate for a time, unable to merge with Nelson. As Doctor Fate, Inza's methods are more proactive although she becomes more reckless in their use, stemming a temporary separation from Kent. The two reconcile their differences upon learning Inza's patron as Doctor Fate originating from a Lord of Chaos, making her an agent of chaos.  The Chaos Lord revealing himself to have subtly influenced some events enough to cause the two to have strife against one another and enjoyed having the Lords of Chaos be a force of good, reasoning that even Chaos Lords did not find evil as favorable. The Chaos Lord would relinquish the powers bestowed to Inza back to himself although she would replace her chaos magic with magics stemming from life and continued acting as Doctor Fate, with Nelson acting alongside her. When operating as separate Doctor Fates, Inza wears the helmet and Kent's original costume while Kent wears the half helmet and costume he used in the late 1940s. Sometime later, the Nelsons and the JSA face the supervillain Extant during Parallax's attempt to change the history of the universe. Extant uses his time manipulation powers to rapidly age Kent and Inza to their proper physical ages. Extant also scatters the helmet, amulet, and cloak. The aged and depowered Nelsons then retire.

In other media 

 Inza Nelson appears in the Smallville two-part episode "Absolute Justice", portrayed by Erica Carroll.
 Inza Nelson appears in the DC Animated Universe, voiced by Jennifer Lien in Superman: The Animated Series and Jennifer Hale in Justice League and Justice League Unlimited.

Invisible Kid

Ion

Iris West

Isamot Kol

Ishmael
Ishmael is the name of different characters appearing in American comic books published by DC Comics.

Ishmael I 
The first Ishmael is a criminal who, alongside his brother Queequeg, is a shapeshifter. Both of them work for Tobias Whale. Ishmael is instructed to pose as the Gangbuster and assassinate the organizer of the gang piece summit. Black Lightning figured out who the impostor Gangbuster was. Ishmael and Queequeg were defeated by Black Lightning and the Gangbuster.

Ishmael II 
The  second Ishmael is a destitute man who was abducted and used for the experiments of the Ark Project. When he was starting to die due to the side effects of the experiments sometime after they were halted by Batman, Ra's al Ghul saved his life with the Lazarus Pit. Since then, he has become a member of the League of Assassins.

Ishmael in other media 
The second Ishmael appears in season 4 of Black Lightning, portrayed by Rico Ball. He is an assassin who is hired by Destiny to deal with Latavius "Lala" Johnson. After killing him and trapping his body in a cement casket, Ishmael states to Destiny that he is planning to kill 100 metahumans to get into the League of Assassins. As he had already killed 94 metahumans, Ishmael is further contracted by Destiny to go after Black Lightning and his allies. Though Tobias later pays him more money while intimidating Destiny to end the Kobra Cartel's gang war with the 100. After finding out what Painkiller did to Jesse Gentilucci, Tobias Whale sends Ishmael to take out Painkiller and Looker. Painkiller manages to kill Ishmael by getting his poison onto the hilt of Ishmael's sword.

Isis

Isis (Selina Kyle's cat)
Isis is Selina Kyle's pet cat, who often assists in her heists. Created for Batman: The Animated Series, she first appeared in the episode "The Cat and the Claw" (September 1992).

When Selina was taken to prison, Isis ran away looking for her. Isis got lost and was found on the streets by Professor Milo, who used her for one of his twisted experiments and infected her with a virus that made her more aggressive. Selina feared she had lost Isis forever, but Batman delivered Isis back to her, completely cured and safe. Isis was voiced by Frank Welker for most of the character's appearances and by Dee Bradley Baker for the animated web series Gotham Girls.

Isis in other media 
 Isis appears in Krypto the Superdog, voiced by Kathleen Barr. She is shown to have fought Krypto the Superdog, Streaky the Supercat and Ace the Bat-Hound, and flirts with Ace much like Catwoman does with Batman.
 Isis appears in Injustice: Gods Among Us. She appears in Catwoman's introduction and ending, taking a jewel from Selina before the fight and giving it back to her when she wins.

References

 DC Comics characters: I, List of